WPXU-TV (channel 38) is a television station licensed to Jacksonville, North Carolina, United States, broadcasting the Ion Television network to southeastern North Carolina. Owned and operated by the Ion Media subsidiary of the E. W. Scripps Company, the station maintains a transmitter near Holly Ridge, North Carolina.

WPXU-TV operates as a full-time satellite of Greenville-licensed WEPX-TV (channel 38). WPXU covers areas of southeastern North Carolina that receive a marginal to non-existent over-the-air signal from WEPX, although there is significant overlap between the two stations' contours otherwise, including in Jacksonville proper. WPXU is a straight simulcast of WEPX; on-air references to WPXU are limited to Federal Communications Commission (FCC)-mandated hourly station identifications during programming. Aside from the transmitter, WPXU does not maintain any physical presence locally in Jacksonville.

WPXU-TV and WEPX-TV were affiliates of MyNetworkTV from September 5, 2006 until September 27, 2009 when MyNetworkTV's affiliation switched over to WITN-TV, prior to this, the stations were solely affiliates of Ion (then known as i: Independent Television and originally known as Pax TV).

Technical information

Subchannels
The station's digital signal is multiplexed:

Out-of-market cable carriage
In recent years, WPXU has been carried on cable in Carolina Beach, which is within the Wilmington media market.

References

External links
Ion Television website

Ion Television affiliates
Court TV affiliates
Defy TV affiliates
Grit (TV network) affiliates
Laff (TV network) affiliates
TrueReal affiliates
Scripps News affiliates
E. W. Scripps Company television stations
Television channels and stations established in 1999
1999 establishments in North Carolina
PXU-TV